James Burton Gibson (24 June 1889 – 5 September 1915) was a Scottish professional footballer who played in the Scottish League for Raith Rovers as a half back.

Personal life 
Gibson was educated at the University of St Andrews, where he played for the football team and graduated with an M.A. Prior to the First World War, he emigrated to New Zealand and became a teacher at Napier Boys' High School. On 18 January 1915, six months after the outbreak of the First World War, Gibson enlisted as a private in the Auckland Infantry Battalion of the New Zealand Expeditionary Force. On 4 September 1915, whilst fighting in the Gallipoli campaign, Gibson was wounded in the ribs and chest by shrapnel and was evacuated to the hospital ship . He died of wounds the following day and was buried at sea on 6 September. He is commemorated on the Lone Pine Memorial and was posthumously awarded the 1914–15 Star, the British War Medal and the Victory Medal.

References 

Scottish footballers
1915 deaths
Military personnel from Fife
New Zealand military personnel of World War I
New Zealand military personnel killed in World War I
1889 births
Raith Rovers F.C. players
Footballers from Kirkcaldy
Scottish schoolteachers
Association football wing halves
New Zealand expatriate sportspeople in Turkey
Scottish Football League players
Scottish emigrants to New Zealand
Alumni of the University of St Andrews
University of St Andrews FC players
Burials at sea
New Zealand Army soldiers